Andrei Leonovich Toom (in Russian: Андрей Леонович Тоом), also known as André Toom, (1942 Tashkent, Soviet Union - 2022 Queens, New York City) was a Russian mathematician known for the Toom–Cook algorithm and Toom's rule. Toom was a retired professor of the statistics department at Federal University of Pernambuco in Brazil. Toom died of unknown causes at his apartment in Flushing, Queens, NYC.

Toom was a student of Ilya Piatetski-Shapiro.

References
His personal Website
His curriculum, in Portuguese and Lattes formatted (Brazilian standard curriculum form) 
 

Living people
1942 births
20th-century Russian mathematicians
21st-century Russian mathematicians
Cellular automatists
Probability theorists
Soviet mathematicians